Cartoonito is a 24-hour cable television channel owned by Warner Bros. Discovery under its International division. Launched on 1 December 2021, it is a localization of the namesake preschool brand for Latin American audiences and airs programs aimed at children aged 2–6.

History 
In October 2021, it was announced on SKY Brasil's lineup that Boomerang would be replaced by Cartoonito on 1 December. Shortly after that, the Argentine pay television service Telered announced the replacement for the rest of Latin America on the same date. Boomerang was replaced by Cartoonito throughout Latin America on 1 December 2021.  Becoming the first Cartoonito feed in the world to undergo the Global re-introduction.

Programming

Current programming

Original programming  
 Batwheels
 Bugs Bunny Builders
 Scooby-Doo and Guess Who?
 The Tom and Jerry Show
 Tom and Jerry in New York

Acquired programming 
 Blippi
 Cleo & Cuquin
 Cocomelon
 Gabby's Dollhouse
 Grizzy and the Lemmings
 Hey Duggee
 La Granja de Zenón
 Lucas the Spider
 Masha and the Bear
 Masha's Tales
 Mecha Builders
 Monica's Gang
 Mundo Bita
 Mundo Bita: Imagine-se
 Mush Mush & the Mushables
 My Magic Pet Morphle
 Odo
 Oddbods
 Pocoyo (season 4 only)
 Sésamo
 Thomas & Friends: All Engines Go
 WeeBoom

Former programming

Original programming 
 Baby Looney Tunes
 Little Ellen
 Yabba-Dabba Dinosaurs

See also 
 Boomerang (Latin American TV channel)
 Cartoon Network (Latin American TV channel)
 Cartoonito
 Discovery Kids (Latin American TV channel)
 Tooncast

External links 
 Official Latin American Website
 Official Brazilian Website
 Official Mexican-localised Website
 Offical Argentina-localised Website

References 

Cartoonito
2021 establishments in Georgia (U.S. state)
Children's television networks
Latin American cable television networks
Preschool education television networks
Television channels and stations established in 2021
Warner Bros. Discovery Americas